Russians in Lebanon are people of Russian origin residing in Lebanon. Most of them are Russian women married to Lebanese men who took off to study in Russia during the Communism wave in the 1970s and 1980s. Most of the older Russian generation resides with their families in the South of Lebanon. There are a few restaurants and Russian food stores in Lebanon but many Russian women have learnt to prepare the finest Lebanese meals. The Russian community in Lebanon has a church where the whole community gathers to practice Orthodox mass on Sundays and it is located in Mazraa, Beirut.

See also 
 Lebanon–Russia relations
 Russians
 Russian diaspora
 Prostitution in Lebanon

External links
Lebanon's sex industry hidden in plain sight
Sex for sale in Beirut
Little Las Vegas and super nightclubs in Lebanon

European diaspora in Lebanon
Ethnic groups in Lebanon
Lebanon